The Aerosmith/ZZ Top Tour, sometimes referred to as the A to Z Tour or Guitar Hero: Aerosmith Tour, was a concert tour headlined by American hard rock bands Aerosmith and ZZ Top. The tour, presented by Guitar Hero: Aerosmith, took place in the summer of 2009 until it had to be cancelled unexpectedly due to shoulder injuries sustained by Aerosmith frontman Steven Tyler.

For the first seven dates of the tour, Aerosmith played the entire Toys in the Attic album at every show, with the exception of the last track, "You See Me Crying". On June 26, 2009, while in Wantagh, New York's Jones Beach Theater, Aerosmith played "You See Me Crying", for the first time in the band's history; it was also the first time on the tour that every song on Toys in the Attic was played. Additionally, this tour marked the first time that the band performed "Round and Round" live.

Other notable highlights of the show included guitarist Joe Perry singing lead vocals on "Combination", a deep-cut from the Rocks album, and playing against the animated version of himself in the Guitar Hero: Aerosmith video game. The tour also featured a select one or two fans at each show playing a song from Guitar Hero: Aerosmith live on-stage before the concert.

ZZ Top was the co-headlining act for the tour, with 3 Doors Down opening the first two shows in Maryland Heights, Missouri and East Troy, Wisconsin, and Dropkick Murphys opening the Mansfield, Massachusetts show, as ZZ Top could not perform for the first three shows due to prior commitments. Several dates were canceled mid-tour after Steven Tyler injured his leg in Uncasville, Connecticut. Additionally, guitarist Brad Whitford and bassist Tom Hamilton had to sit out several of the dates due to injuries or surgeries; Whitford and Hamilton had substitutes perform in their places. Saving Abel opened for Aerosmith at their August 5 show in Sturgis, South Dakota, but Aerosmith cancelled the rest of the tour after Tyler fell off the stage in Sturgis. The band played three more shows in October and November after Tyler recovered, while ZZ Top booked alternate tour dates and venues and remained on tour alone for much of the rest of the year.

History

Background
Steven Tyler announced on VH1 Classic Radio on September 4, 2008, that Aerosmith intended to enter the studio at the end of September 2008 to complete the band's 15th studio album. Tyler also confirmed that the band planned to begin a new US tour in June 2009, in support of the as-yet-untitled album. This tour was supposed to be preceded by a concert in Venezuela on February 1, 2009. However, on January 15, 2009, Tyler said the band would be unable to play the gig because of a second knee injury of guitarist Joe Perry. In mid-February 2009, it was announced that the album would be produced by the famed Brendan O'Brien and that the album would likely be recorded live, like their earlier records. Although the band had hoped to finish the album before the tour started in June 2009, Perry said that the group "realized there wasn't any chance of getting [the album] finished before we hit the road for the summer". The tour featured ZZ Top as the opening act for most of its performances. The Aerosmith/ZZ Top Tour, presented by Guitar Hero: Aerosmith, was officially announced and the first dates released on April 8, 2009.

 The tour was slated to take the band across North America from June to September 2009. The Aerosmith/ZZ Top Tour represented the first time that Aerosmith and ZZ Top had performed on the same stage in 33 years.

Tour and incidents
The tour featured the band performing nearly all of the songs on their 1975 album Toys in the Attic during the first seven dates, and also featured Joe Perry sing lead vocals on the 1976 "Combination". The band was plagued with several health problems, over the course of the summer, however. Guitarist Brad Whitford had to sit out the first seven dates of the tour in order to recover from head surgery, after injuring his head getting out of his car. On June 28, 2009, at the band's seventh show of the tour at the Mohegan Sun Arena in Uncasville, Connecticut, lead singer Steven Tyler injured his leg, which required seven shows to be postponed. A review of the Mohegan Sun show noted that Tyler "seemed frustrated by the sound and plagued by mic troubles, which caused him to disappear under the stage and miss his cues".

As soon as the band resumed the tour on July 15, Whitford returned to the fold. However, Tom Hamilton had to depart in order to recover from non-invasive surgery. David Hull filled in for Hamilton until he recovered. On August 5, 2009, at a concert in Sturgis, South Dakota, Tyler fell off the catwalk midway through the concert while dancing to entertain fans during a break in the show due to sound system failure. He was helped up by security staff and taken backstage, before guitarist Joe Perry told the audience the show was over. Tyler was airlifted to Rapid City Regional Hospital, where he received treatment for head and neck injuries and a broken shoulder. In the wake of Tyler's injuries, the band was forced to postpone five shows in Western Canada. On August 14, 2009, Aerosmith announced that they had decided to cancel the rest of their US tour dates with ZZ Top, due to Tyler's injuries. One of the cancelled dates was for 107.7 (KSAN) FM's tenth annual "Bone Bash" concert event, which was cancelled in its entirety.

Post-cancellation developments
Within days after Aerosmith's withdrawal, ZZ Top issued a press release stating in part that it would immediately begin setting new tour dates, for which "routing will take ZZ Top to many of the markets that had been on that cancelled tour's itinerary, giving fans a second chance, in a manner of speaking, to see the band after all". ZZ Top "almost immediately began booking new gigs" entering into a "continuation tour" for the following several months. ZZ Top also made up for the missed Bone Bash concert in 2010, playing the date as the headliner with .38 Special opening.

In the midst of the tour, Perry completed work on his fifth solo album, Have Guitar, Will Travel and drummer Joey Kramer released his autobiography, Hit Hard. Perry's solo album was released on October 6, 2009. with one source noting that "it was the cancellation of the Aerosmith's tour because of lead singer Steven Tyler's stage accident that propelled Perry to finish his fifth solo effort".

In October, with Tyler having recovered from his injuries, Aeorsmith returned to performing with a previously-schedule private appearance for Oracle in San Francisco. Two shows were then played in Hawaii, one in Maui and one in Honolulu, with the show in Maui being played as part of a legal settlement after the band was sued for cancelling a performance there in 2007. In early November, the band played a concert in Abu Dhabi, United Arab Emirates, at the Grand Prix.

Relations between Tyler and Perry soured in wake of Tyler falling off the stage in Sturgis and reached a fever pitch in November when a heavily publicized feud erupted in which Tyler was supposedly going to leave the band and be replaced by another singer. On November 9, 2009, the media reported that Tyler had no contact with the other members of Aerosmith and that they were unsure if he was still in the band. On November 10, 2009, Joe Perry confirmed Tyler had quit Aerosmith to pursue a solo career and was unsure whether the move was indefinite. No replacement was announced. Despite rumors of leaving the band, and notwithstanding Perry's comment as reported earlier the same day, Tyler joined the Joe Perry Project onstage November 10, 2009, at the Fillmore New York at Irving Plaza and performed "Walk This Way". According to sources at the event, Tyler assured the crowd that despite rumors to the contrary, he is "not quitting Aerosmith". Tensions cooled after Tyler returned from rehab, where he was seeking treatment for an addiction to painkillers, and the band announced a world tour to take place in 2010, entitled the Cocked, Locked, Ready to Rock Tour. That tour would ultimately play in many locations that the band missed due to the cancellation of dates on 2009 tour.

Personnel

Aerosmith
 Steven Tyler – lead vocals, harmonica, piano
 Joe Perry – guitar, backing vocals, talkbox (on "Sweet Emotion"), pedal steel guitar (on "Rag Doll"), lead vocals (on "Combination")
 Brad Whitford – guitar
 Tom Hamilton – bass
 Joey Kramer – drums, percussion

Additional personnel:
 Russ Irwin – keyboards, backing vocals
 Bobby Schneck – guitar (substituted for Brad Whitford, June 10 – June 28)
 David Hull – bass (substituted for Tom Hamilton, July 15 – August 5)

ZZ Top
 Billy Gibbons – vocals, guitar
 Dusty Hill – bass, keyboards, vocals
 Frank Beard – drums, percussion

Tour dates
Tour dates announced as of April 2009 included: 

ZZ Top continuation tour dates picked up after Aerosmith's departure included September 9 at South Bend, Indiana, Roanoke, Virginia on September 11, and nine shows in Canadian cities between November 17 and December 1.

Set

ZZ Top Set list
1. "Got Me Under Pressure"
2. "Waitin' for the Bus"
3. "Jesus Just Left Chicago"
4. "Pincushion"
5. "Cheap Sunglasses"
6. "I Need You Tonight"
7. "Heard It on the X"
8. "Just Got Paid"
9. "Gimme All Your Lovin'"
10. "Sharp Dressed Man"
11. "Legs"
12. "La Grange"
13. "Tush"

Aerosmith performed songs

Below is a list of songs played on the tour:

A typical setlist would look like this.

1. "Train Kept A Rollin'"
2. "Cryin'"
3. "Love In An Elevator"
4. "Jaded"
5. "Dream On"
6. "Combination"
7. "Toys In The Attic"
8. "Uncle Salty"
9. "Adam's Apple"
10. "Walk This Way"
11. "Big Ten Inch Record"
12. "Sweet Emotion"
13. "No More No More"
14. "Round And Round"
15. "Livin' On The Edge"
Encore:
1. "Dirty Water"
2. "Come Together"

References

Aerosmith concert tours
ZZ Top concert tours
Co-headlining concert tours
2009 concert tours